The Silk Road is a 3 episode BBC TV documentary about the Silk Road, made in 2016. It was presented by historian Sam Willis and comprised three episodes, shown on BBC Four between 1 and 15 May 2016.

See also
 The Silk Road (NHK TV Series), 1980s joint Chinese/Japanese production

References

External links
 
 

2016 British television series debuts
2016 British television series endings
BBC high definition shows
BBC television documentaries about prehistoric and ancient history
English-language television shows
BBC television documentaries about medieval history